Anna Chiappe Iacomini (born Anna Chiappa; July 26, 1898, Lucca, Italy - June 16, 1990) was an Italian-born woman who was the wife and chronicler of José Carlos Mariátegui.

Life
Born in Italy, Iacomini was the daughter of Iacopa Iacomini and Domenico Chiappe, a coffee merchant who traveled frequently to Brazil. Iacomini spent her early years in Lucca and Siena. When she was 12 years old, her mother died. She moved to Florence for high school, but when she was 16, her father died, leading an uncle to provide for her.

Iacomini married José Carlos Mariátegui. The couple first lived in Rome where their first child, Sandro Mariátegui Chiappe, was born in 1921. On February 11, 1923, the family departed from Antwerp on the "Negada" steamer, arriving at Callao in Peru on March 17, 1923.

In 1924, Mariátegui's right leg was amputated.  Iacomini nursed him back to health in a long convalescence . After a season in the "Leuro", Miraflores area, the family in 1925 settled in the Casa de Washington in Lima, The poem dedicated by José Carlos Mariátegui is known, entitled "The life you gave me".

Mariátegui died in April 1930.  After his death Iacomini devoted the rest of her life to providing for their four children, preserving her husband's work, and publicizing it.

On October 29. 1975,  Mariátegui was posthumously awarded the Order The Sun of Peru in the Officer's Degree in a ceremony held at the Palace of Torre Tagle. On July 26, 1986, Anna Chiappe received the Civic Medal of the City of Lima, on his eighty-fifth anniversary, at his home in Miraflores.

Chiappe Iacomini died on June 16, 1990.

References

1898 births
1990 deaths
People from Lucca
Place of death missing
20th-century Italian women
Italian emigrants to Peru